Hsieh Su-wei and Barbora Strýcová were the two-time defending champions, but they chose not to participate.

Alexa Guarachi and Darija Jurak won the title, defeating Xu Yifan and Yang Zhaoxuan in the final, 6–0, 6–3.

Seeds

Draw

Finals

Top half

Bottom half

References

External links
Main Draw

2021 WTA Tour
Doubles women